Helter Seltzer is the fifth studio album by American indie rock band We Are Scientists. It was released on April 22, 2016, by 100% Records.

Promotion

Singles
"Buckle" was released on March 18, 2016, as the album's lead single. The album's second single, "Too Late", was released on April 1, 2016. The third single, "Classic Love", was released on April 15, 2016.

Promotional singles
The album's track "Headlights" was premiered through Clash on April 20, 2016.

Performances
The band appeared on The Late Show with Stephen Colbert on June 30, 2016, performing "Buckle".

Track listing

Charts

References

2016 albums
We Are Scientists albums